Davit I may refer to:

 Davit I, Caucasian Albanian Catholicos c. 399
 David I of Iberia, Prince in 876–881
 David I of Imereti, King in 1259–1293